Édouard Duplan (born 13 May 1983) is a French former professional footballer who plays as a winger. He played for RBC Roosendaal, Sparta Rotterdam, Utrecht, ADO Den Haag, and RKVV Westlandia in the Netherlands after starting his career in his native France with Choisy Le Roi, ES Viry-Châtillon, and Clermont Foot.

Club career
Born in Athis-Mons, Essonne, Duplan started his career at Choisy le Roi and made his name at Clermont Foot before moving to Dutch side RBC Roosendaal in 2006. Soon he became a crowd favourite at RBC which also earned him a transfer to Sparta Rotterdam in summer 2007. However, he was seriously injured in his first match for Sparta which cut short his first season in Rotterdam.

In the summer of 2010 he made a transfer to FC Utrecht. At the end of the season 2011–2012 Duplan won the David di Tommaso trophy when the supporters of FC Utrecht voted him as best player of the season.

References

External links
 
 Voetbal International profile 
 Dutch fansite: www.duplan.nl 

1983 births
Living people
People from Athis-Mons
Footballers from Essonne
Association football midfielders
French footballers
Ligue 2 players
Eerste Divisie players
Eredivisie players
Derde Divisie players
ES Viry-Châtillon players
Clermont Foot players
RBC Roosendaal players
Sparta Rotterdam players
FC Utrecht players
ADO Den Haag players
RKVV Westlandia players
French expatriate footballers
Expatriate footballers in the Netherlands
French expatriate sportspeople in the Netherlands
AS Choisy-le-Roi players